Aka Morchiladze is the pen name of Giorgi Akhvlediani (გიორგი ახვლედიანი) (born 10 November 1966), a Georgian writer and literary historian who authored some of the best-selling prose of post-Soviet Georgian literary fiction. Morchiladze's work shows reorientation of the early 21st-century Georgian literature towards the Western influences.

Biography
Born in Tbilisi, Morchiladze graduated in 1988 from the Department of History, Tbilisi State University, where he later taught. In the 1990s, he worked as a sports journalist and literary columnist for Tbilisi's press. Since 1998, Morchiladze's twenty novels and three collections of short stories have been published by the Sulakauri Publishing. Several of his works have been filmed and staged.

Bibliography
One hundred million pounds away, Artanuji Publishing House, 2015
Shadow on the Road, Bakur Sulakauri Publishing, 2014
The Shy Emerald, Bakur Sulakauri Publishing, 2013
Georgian Notebooks, Bakur Sulakauri Publishing, 2013
Obolé, Bakur Sulakauri Publishing, 2011
Mameluk, Bakur Sulakauri Publishing, 2009
The Secret Keeper’s Belt, Bakur Sulakauri Publishing, 2008
Once in Georgia, Saga Publishing House, 2008
Of Old Hearts and Swords, Bakur Sulakauri Publishing, 2007
Maid in Tiflis Bakur Sulakauri, Publishing, 2007
The Paper Bullet, Bakur Sulakauri Publishing, 2006, 2011
Venera’s Dream, Bakur Sulakauri Publishing, 2005
Mr. Deaxley’s Silent Box, Bakur Sulakauri Publishing, 2005
Santa Esperanza, Bakur Sulakauri Publishing, 2004, 2008
A Whale on Madatov Island, Bakur Sulakauri Publishing, 2004
Down with the Corn Republic, Bakur Sulakauri Publishing, 2003, 2011
The Wretched of the Desert, Bakur Sulakauri Publishing, 2003
The book, Bakur Sulakauri Publishing, 2003, 2011 
The Other, Bakur Sulakauri Publishing, 2002, 2011
Your Adventure, Bakur Sulakauri Publishing, 2002
Disappearance on Madatov Island, Bakur Sulakauri Publishing, 2001
Playing Patience in August, Bakur Sulakauri Publishing, 2001, 2011
Witches of Christmas Eve, Bakur Sulakauri Publishing, 2001, 2011
Flight over Madatov Island and Back, Bakur Sulakauri Publishing, 1998, 2004, 2011
Dogs of Paliashvili Street, Bakur Sulakauri Publishing, 1995, 2002, 2011
Journey to Karabakh, Bakur Sulakauri Publishing, 1992

References 

1966 births
Writers from Tbilisi
Living people
Postmodern writers
Novelists from Georgia (country)
Tbilisi State University alumni
Academic staff of Tbilisi State University
Expatriates from Georgia (country) in the United Kingdom